The Bachelorette is an American reality television dating game show that debuted on ABC on January 8, 2003. The show is a spin-off of The Bachelor and the staple part of The Bachelor franchise. The first season featured Trista Rehn, the runner-up from the first season of The Bachelor, offering the opportunity for Rehn to choose a husband among 25 bachelors. The 2004 season of The Bachelorette again took a runner-up from the previous season of The Bachelor. After last airing on February 28, 2005, the series returned to ABC during the spring of 2008, following an absence of three years, and has since become an annual staple of the network's summer programming.

For its first 16 seasons the show was hosted by Chris Harrison. JoJo Fletcher took on temporary hosting duties during season 16 when Harrison was isolating having taken his son to college.

In March 2021, the show announced it would air two seasons for the first time ever. The seventeenth season debuted on June 7, 2021, with former Bachelorettes Tayshia Adams and Kaitlyn Bristowe as hosts. The eighteenth season premiered on October 19, 2021, with Adams and Bristowe returning as co-hosts.

In March 2022, it was announced that there would be two Bachelorettes in one season. The 19th season premiered on July 11, 2022, with Jesse Palmer as host. Although season 11 featured two Bachelorettes in the first episode, and season 16 featured two consecutive Bachelorettes within a season, this marked the first time that two women lead concurrently for the entire season.

Plot
All of the rules are adapted from the rules of its parent show, The Bachelor. As the name implies, it is essentially a gender-swapped version of The Bachelor: the series revolves around a single bachelorette, usually a former contestant from a recent Bachelor season, and a pool of romantic interests (typically 25, though sometimes more) which could include a potential husband for the bachelorette. The show starts with the bachelorette standing in front of the mansion and greeting each male contestant individually, as they make an entrance to the bachelorette. After each rose ceremony, at least one contestant does not receive a rose and goes home; therefore, the pool of contenders gets smaller, and eventually leaves the bachelorette to decide between two contestants in the final rose ceremony.

For the final selection, one of two male suitors proposes to the bachelorette. Unlike its parent show, all sixteen seasons of The Bachelorette have ended with a proposal which the bachelorette either accepted or declined. The series has resulted in five marriages to date: Trista Rehn's to Ryan Sutter, Ashley Hebert's to JP Rosenbaum, Desiree Hartsock's to Chris Siegfried, Rachel Lindsay’s to Bryan Abasolo, and JoJo Fletcher's to Jordan Rodgers. The first two weddings were broadcast on ABC. Season 16 was the only season did not hold an After the Final Rose special due to circumstances over the COVID-19 pandemic and Christmas holiday.

Casting 
Season 11 was the first season to feature a twist in casting. Since producers could not decide between The Bachelor Season 19 contenders Kaitlyn Bristowe and Britt Nilsson, the 25 men participating had to decide which bachelorette would make the best wife. In the end, more men voted for Kaitlyn and Britt was sent home on the first night.

Season 13 was the first season to have an African-American contestant, Rachel Lindsay, as the lead in the entire Bachelor franchise. Season 16 was the first season to feature two bachelorettes. Clare Crawley was initially cast, but left the show after becoming engaged to contestant Dale Moss. Tayshia Adams was then brought in to complete the season.

In March 2021, after host Chris Harrison announced he was "stepping away" from the franchise, former Bachelorettes Tayshia Adams and Kaitlyn Bristowe were announced as co-hosts for season 17. In June 2021, a day after the season 17 premiere, Harrison announced he was leaving the franchise altogether.

Season 19 was the third season to feature two Bachelorettes, Gabby Windey and Rachel Recchia; however, it was the first season to feature both leads for the entire season.

Questions of authenticity
Family Guy parodied the show's authenticity in the episode "Brian the Bachelor" on June 26, 2005.

The Bachelorette season 4 winner, Jesse Csincsak, commented that contestants must follow producers' orders and that a storyline was fabricated in the editing room.

On March 15, 2010, The Bachelorette creator Mike Fleiss appeared on 20/20 to confess that he developed the show's contestants into characters that catered to his audience's tastes, and that they "need [their] fair share of villains every season". Fleiss has come under fire for admitting that The Bachelor has less to do with reality than it does making good television.

By season 7 of The Bachelorette, some believed that actors were being hired by ABC to play specific roles on the show. Some viewers were becoming tired of the show's scripted nature and speaking out.

In 2018, Amy Kaufman published a book titled, Bachelor Nation: Inside the World of America's Favorite Guilty Pleasure. This book provided insight on some of the manipulation tactics that producers employ in order to create drama and garner controversy as a ratings ploy.

The podcast Game of Roses launched in 2019 and critiques the series as a 'game'. They have since published the book 'How to win The Bachelor'.

Setting
Much like the parent show, the first two seasons were filmed in a luxurious house in Los Angeles County, California, and "Villa De La Vina" in Agoura Hills, California, for later seasons. Since the fifth season, the third and remaining episodes filmed around the world. Episodes have been filmed throughout the United States, Canada, Spain, Iceland, Turkey, Portugal, Thailand, China (Hong Kong only), Bermuda, England, Croatia, Czech Republic, Germany, France, Italy, Belgium and Ireland. In season 3, filming was located in New York City; Charlotte, North Carolina, for season 8, where Emily Maynard lived, so that she could stay with her daughter Ricki during production. In addition to Villa De La Vina mansion, the contestants in seasons 4 and 5 lived in a bunkhouse close to the mansion.

Due to the concerns surrounding over the COVID-19 pandemic, when the mansion was strictly restricted for filming purposes, the sixteenth and seventeenth seasons filmed entirely within the United States being isolated on a quarantine type bio-secure bubble atmosphere around single location at the hotel or resort they rented by production. While the eighteenth season filmed mostly in the United States, some quarantine restrictions began lifted with limited travel.

Seasons

Reunion
On April 10, 2019, it was announced that a two-hour special titled Bachelorette Reunion: The Biggest Bachelorette Reunion in Bachelor History Ever! would premiere on May 6, 2019. Bachelorettes from seasons 2 and 3, Meredith Phillips and Jen Schefft didn't make an appearance during the reunion special. Although host Chris Harrison claimed Meredith Phillips was unavailable to attend, Reality Steve reported her sending him the text “No, I was never contacted or spoke to anyone. I didn’t even know the show was happening.” in regards to the reunion. Schefft couldn't make it due to a long-planned family vacation.

Ratings

Notes

See also
 A Shot at Love with Tila Tequila (2007)
 I Love New York (2007)
 Transamerican Love Story (2008)

Notes

References

External links
 
 

American Broadcasting Company original programming
Television series by Warner Bros. Television Studios
Reality television spin-offs
2000s American game shows
2010s American game shows
2020s American game shows
2000s American reality television series
2010s American reality television series
2020s American reality television series
2003 American television series debuts
2005 American television series endings
2008 American television series debuts
American dating and relationship reality television series
American television series revived after cancellation
English-language television shows
Warner Bros. Television Studios franchises
Television series by Warner Horizon Television
Bachelorette
American television spin-offs